Events from the year 1758 in Canada.

Incumbents
French Monarch: Louis XV
British and Irish Monarch: George II

Governors
Governor General of New France: Pierre François de Rigaud, Marquis de Vaudreuil-Cavagnal
Colonial Governor of Louisiana: Louis Billouart
Governor of Nova Scotia: Charles Lawrence
Commodore-Governor of Newfoundland: Richard Edwards

Events
 Saturday July 8 - Battle of Carillon: General James Abercrombie, with 15,390 men, attacks 3,600 French and Canadian troops entrenched and barricaded at Fort Ticonderoga. The British and American colonial forces are repulsed and lose 2,000 killed and wounded.
 Wednesday July 27 - Capitulation of Louisbourg: After a 48 days siege, the British, under James Wolfe and Jeffery Amherst, capture Louisbourg, defended by about 5,637 French soldiers and sailors.
 August 26–28 - Battle of Fort Frontenac: Colonel John Bradstreet, with nearly 3,000 men, mostly colonial militia, takes and burns Fort Frontenac, (present-day Kingston).
 Thursday September 14 - Battle of Fort Duquesne: Major James Grant, with 800 Highlanders and some Virginians, is defeated by 500 French and Indians, from Fort Duquesne (present-day Pittsburgh), under Charles Philippe Aubry.
 Monday October 2 - The Nova Scotia Provincial Parliament, Canada's oldest Legislative Assembly, first met on 2 October 1758 with 22 members. For the first hundred years, this Assembly was known as the Provincial Parliament, and an elected member was called "MPP" Member of the Provincial Parliament. Since 1867, the name "Parliament" has been reserved for the federal assembly at Ottawa, and the Nova Scotia Assembly has been known as the "Legislature", with an elected member called "MLA" Member of the Legislative Assembly.
 Thursday:) October 12 - Charles Lawrence, Military Governor of Nova Scotia, issued a Proclamation that is published in the Boston Gazette, informing the people of New England that since the enemy which had formerly disturbed and harassed the province was no longer able to do so, the time had come to people and cultivate, not only the lands made vacant by the removal of the Acadians, but other parts of "this valuable province" as well. The Proclamation concluded with the words "I shall be ready to receive any proposals that may be hereafter made to me for effectually settling the vacated, or any other lands within the said province."
 Saturday November 25 - The French garrison of Fort Duquesne (500) set it on fire and abandoned it to General John Forbes. He renames it "Pittsburg," in honor of the Prime Minister of Great Britain, William Pitt the Elder.
 English begin capturing French fortifications, New France and Ohio Valley, the war started going their way decisively this year.

Births

Deaths

Historical documents
Outnumbered 7 to 1, Rogers' Rangers fight seesaw battle in 4 feet of snow near Lake George before retreating (Note: "savages" used)

Even with 3,000 troops behind shore breastworks, French fail to stop British (led by Wolfe, Lawrence and Whitmore) from landing near Louisbourg

During siege of Louisbourg, British build protective earthen wall (9' tall, 16' wide and 1/4 mile long) "to be Proof against all Cannon Ball"

Acadian resistance leader Charles Boishébert arrives at Louisbourg with "a Party of Canadians and Indians" to harass British

"A dismal Scene of total Destruction!" - Louisbourg harbour littered with ship hulks and sunken vessels ravaged by flames and cannon fire

Post-capitulation tour of Louisbourg through its "stinking Lanes they call Streets" and its good and bad fortifications

Taking Île Saint-Jean removes grain and cattle supplier for Canada and "great annoyance to our settlement in Nova Scotia" (Note: "savages" used)

"Wherever he went with his troops, desolation followed" - Wolfe's forces destroy Gulf towns, including one that offers 150,000 livre ransom

Sachems convince 200 Indigenous fighters not to ambush British forces landing at Saint John River, but priest upriver upbraids them

Officer in Maj. Gen. Abercrombie's headquarters describes failed assault on Fort Carillon at Ticonderoga

Mostly provincial force takes Fort Frontenac along with all French vessels on Lake Ontario and "immense quantity of provisions and goods"

Acadians of Cape Sable beg Massachusetts government to accept and protect them as faithful subjects and taxpayers (Note: "savages" used)

Living "more comfortably" than would be expected, Acadian women and children taken prisoner in Nova Scotia and their houses burned

"A vast empire, the Seat of Power & Learning" - James Wolfe writes to his mother his vision of British colonies' future

News that 35 Casco Bay families and 30 families of Irish weavers and linen workers wish to join Annapolis residents in settling along Annapolis River

Enslaved Black African, "supposing himself ill used," escapes to woods, is fired on by panicky blockhouse guard, and returns to Annapolis

Memories of "impertinent" Acadian residents who, when near British, would call their oxen Luther, Calvin and Cranmer and then thrash them

Nova Scotia law makes divorce possible only in cases of impotence, consanguinity, adultery, or desertion, as judged by Council

Penalties in Nova Scotia for blasphemy (pillory or jail), drunkenness (fine), counterfeiting (pillory with ears nailed, plus whipping) and other crimes

References 

 
Canada
58